The Barbican Conservatory is the second largest conservatory in London, located at the Barbican Centre. It houses more than 2,000 species of plants and trees, as well as terrapins and koi carp.

References

External links

Barbican Estate
Gardens in London